Sue Buckett (born 1 January 1944) is a former England women's international footballer.  She represented the England women's national football team at senior international level and spent most of her career at  Southampton Women's F.C.

International career

Sue Buckett made her first appearance for England against Scotland on 18 November 1972, winning England's 3–2 victory.

Honours
 Southampton
 FA Women's Cup: 1970–71, 1971–72, 1972–73, 1974–75, 1975–76, 1977–78, 1978–79, 1980–81

References

1944 births
People from Wokingham
Living people
Southampton Women's F.C. players
English women's footballers
Southampton Saints L.F.C. players
FA Women's National League players
England women's international footballers
Women's association football goalkeepers